Desmond Ng (Chinese: 黄振隆, pinyin: huáng zhèn lóng, born 5 October 1987) is a Singaporean singer, actor and presenter. He debuted in 2009 as a getai singer and in 2015, became the champion of the Mediacorp Getai Challenge. Ng then signed with The Celebrity Agency as an artiste.

Career 
In the early days, Ng and Wang Weiliang were Getai partners and also formed a BumpHead group, which was subsequently disbanded.

In 2009, Ng became his singing career as a Getai Singer. He participated in the 4th Global Min Nan Idol Singing Contest and ranked global top 8. In 2011, he won the STOMP Getai Award "Best Newcomer Award".  

Ng also made a cameo appearance as a new recruit in the Singapore film Ah Boys to Men directed by Jack Neo.  

In 2015, Ng participated in Mediacorp Getai Challenge and became the champion and subsequently signed on as an artiste with Medicorp via The Celebrity Agency. 

In 2016. Ng made his acting debut with Mediacorp Chinese drama television series Hero as Mr. Lu He also acted in 118 II as Xiao Bing.  

With Lin Chengze, Huang Xiuping and Luo Yiqi, they sang the theme song of the movie Long Long Time Ago directed by Jack Neo.  Hosted the Mediacorp Channel 8 program "Bengpire". 2017, presented the Mediacorp Channel 8 program "Oh My Heroes", participated in the Mediacorp Channel 8 TV series "Have A Little Faith" as Jeff. 2018, participated in presented the Mediacorp Channel 8 programme "Taste of Nanyang", presented Mediacorp Channel 8 programme "Fun With SINGnese 1", presented Mediacorp Channel 8 singing competition programme "Getai Challenge 2 Heng Ong Huat", presented Mediacorp Channel 8 programme "Thrift Hunters". 2019, participated in MediaCorp Channel 8 Dialect Series "How Are You" as Mei Dahan, MediaCorp Channel 8 TV Series "Dear Neighbours" as Liao Zhenxiong / Egg Boy, and Mediacorp Channel 8 TV series "Old Is Gold" as Liu Junyang, presented Mediacorp Channel 8 programme "Fun With SINGnese 2". 2020, participated in Mediacorp Channel 8 Dialect Series "How Are You 2" as Mei Dahan, and Mediacorp meWATCH online Series "Love Unbound" as Xiao Yu. Presented Mediacorp Channel 8 programme "Song We Love". 

2021, participated in Mediacorp Channel 8 TV series "My Star Bride" as Qin Shengli, and Mediacorp Channel 8 TV series "The Heartland Hero" played as Fang Zhongcheng.

Discography

Filmography

TV Series

Film

Theatre

Programmes

Awards and honours

References

External Link
 
 

Living people
1987 births
Montfort Secondary School alumni
Singaporean male television actors
21st-century Singaporean male singers
Singaporean Mandopop singers
Singaporean people of Chinese descent